Tullahoma High School is a public high school located in Tullahoma, Coffee County, Tennessee. It is operated by the Tullahoma City Schools.

Campus

The current high school in Tullahoma was established on the North Jackson Street campus in 1956 and was known as the, "Million Dollar High School," due to the initial construction cost. The most recent addition to the building was the construction of the science wing in 1995. Work on the Wilkins Stadium began in March 2009 and the new stadium complex was completed as the 2009 school year opened. The THS Auditorium was redesigned and renovation was completed in May 2010. As of 2018, Tullahoma High School has upgraded their security policies.

Programs
The Tullahoma High School Band competes annually in marching competitions in the fall and concert festivals in the spring. The vocal department supports three vocal groups, including the THS Aristocrats, a chorale and show choir that has won many state and regional competitions stretching back to 1976.

The school's athletic program has had past state team championships in baseball and golf as well as individual championships in wrestling and track.

A Marine Corps Junior ROTC program was established in 2002.

High School 101
In the 2010–11 school year, Tullahoma High School initiated a freshman academy called "High School 101" that is intended to provide small learning community for students in their first year in the high school.

Notable alumni
Dewon Brazelton, professional baseball player
 Samantha Burton, actress 
 David Hess, professional baseball player
Steve Matthews, National Football League quarterback
Antonio London, National Football League linebacker
 Dustin Lynch, singer/songwriter (graduated in 2003)
Bryan Morris, professional baseball player
 Jordan Sheffield, professional baseball player 
 Justus Sheffield, professional baseball player 
 Craig Terry, Grammy-award winning pianist
 Brandon Wrinn, professional musician/songwriter who currently plays for Universal Country Artist Lauren Alaina (graduated 2000)

See also
List of high schools in Tennessee
Public school funding in the United States

References

External links

Educational institutions established in 1956
Public high schools in Tennessee
Schools in Coffee County, Tennessee
1956 establishments in Tennessee